KKEY-LP (channel 13) is a low-power television station in Bakersfield, California, United States, affiliated with the Spanish-language Telemundo network. It is owned by Nexstar Media Group alongside NBC affiliate KGET-TV (channel 17). Both stations share studios on L Street in downtown Bakersfield, while KKEY-LP's transmitter is located atop Mount Adelaide.

In addition to its own digital signal, KKEY-LP is simulcast in standard definition on KGET-TV's third digital subchannel (17.3) from the same transmitter site.

History
The station was formerly known as K14IK and carried a low-power signal on UHF channel 14. In 2003, it moved to VHF channel 11 and was renamed KKEY-LP and became a Telemundo affiliate that same year. Previously, Telemundo programming was piped through KVEA on cable providers. On April 20, 2007, Clear Channel Communications (now iHeartMedia) entered into an agreement to sell its entire television stations group to Newport Television, a broadcasting holding company established by the private equity firm Providence Equity Partners. This deal closed on March 14, 2008. However, due to Providence Equity Partners' partial ownership stake in rival Spanish-language network Univision, the owner of MyNetworkTV affiliate KUVI-TV (channel 45), KKEY-LP was sold along with KGET-TV and five other stations (CBS affiliate KGPE in Fresno, KTVX and KUCW in Salt Lake City, WOAI-TV in San Antonio, and WTEV-TV in Jacksonville) to High Plains Broadcasting. However, due to KKEY-LP's low-power status, it was excluded along with KTVX from the deal, which was finalized on September 15, 2008. Newport Television continued to operate KGET through a shared services agreement.

Newport agreed to sell KKEY-LP and KGET-TV, as well as KGPE in Fresno, to Nexstar Broadcasting Group on November 5, 2012. The sale was completed on February 19, 2013.

On December 3, 2018, Nexstar announced it would acquire the assets of Chicago-based Tribune Media for $6.4 billion in cash and debt. The deal—which would make Nexstar the largest television station operator by total number of stations upon its expected closure late in the third quarter of 2019—would result in KKEY-LP and KGET-TV gaining additional sister stations in nearby markets including Los Angeles (CW affiliate KTLA) and San Diego (Fox affiliate KSWB-TV). The sale was approved by the FCC on September 16 and was completed on September 19, 2019.

Technical information

Subchannel

Analog-to-digital conversion
The analog signal went off the air on July 31, 2009, and for a year KKEY only existed as a subchannel of KGET and was even rebranded "Telemundo 17.3". On July 23, 2010, the analog signal on channel 11 came back on the air—just nine days before the station's analog license was to be cancelled by the Federal Communications Commission (FCC). In April 2014, the analog signal on channel 11 went off the air and a high definition digital signal went on the air on channel 13.

References

External links 
Telemundo 17.3

KEY-LP
Telemundo network affiliates
Television channels and stations established in 1997
1997 establishments in California
KEY-LP
Low-power television stations in the United States
Nexstar Media Group